The 1940 Rutgers Queensmen football team represented Rutgers University in the 1940 college football season. In their third season under head coach Harvey Harman, the Queensmen compiled a 5–3 record and outscored their opponents 211 to 56.

Schedule

References

Rutgers
Rutgers Scarlet Knights football seasons
Rutgers Queensmen football